The Men's Downhill competition of the 1976 Winter Olympics at Innsbruck, Austria, was held at Patscherkofel on Thursday, 5 February, on the same course as in 1964.

The defending world champion was David Zwilling of Austria, who had recently retired; Bernhard Russi of Switzerland was the defending Olympic champion. Franz Klammer of Austria was the defending World Cup downhill champion and led the current season; he had also won the pre-Olympic World Cup downhill at Patcherkofel a year earlier in January 1975.

Klammer won the gold medal, Russi took the silver, and Herbert Plank of Italy was the bronze medalist.

At age 22, the win elevated him to an international celebrity and he was featured on the cover of Sports Illustrated.

Egon Zimmermann, also of Austria, took the gold medal a dozen years earlier in the 1964 Olympic downhill. His winning time was 2:18.16, more than a half-minute behind Klammer's.

Through 2018, no Olympic men's downhill champion has repeated; Russi remains the sole defender to medal.

Results

References

External links
FIS results

1976
Men's alpine skiing at the 1976 Winter Olympics
Winter Olympics
Men's downhill